Ferdowsi University of Mashhad (FUM, Danushgah-e Ferdusi-ye Mashhad) is a public university in Mashhad, the capital city of the Iranian province of Razavi Khorasan. FUM is named after Abul-Qâsem Ferdowsi Tusi, who is considered to be the national epic poet of Greater Iran. Having been established in 1949, FUM is the third-oldest modern university in Iran.

FUM is among the most prestigious universities in Iran, and had been ranked as the 3rd best university of the nation in the 2018 ISC rankings published by the Iranian government. FUM offers 180 bachelors, master's, and Ph.D. programs to 30,000 students. It has 810 faculty members and 2500 staff members. FUM has the highest number of enrollments of foreign students in Iran. Foreign students, from countries such as Afghanistan, Syria, and Iraq make up a significant portion of the students.

Mission 
The mission of the Ferdowsi University of Mashhad is to educate the citizens and citizen-leaders of society based on divine principles of Islam and scientifically qualified centers of excellence. FUM has some mosques, the most prominent of which is the mosque of Imam Reza (which was built a few years ago).

History 
If the upgrading of the College of Health to the status of Faculty of Medicine in 1949 is regarded as the first step in establishing the Ferdowsi University of Mashhad, the university is the fifth oldest in Iran after the universities of Tehran (1934), Tabriz (1947), Shiraz (1946) and Isfahan (1946), not counting the founding of other academic colleges such as the West Minster Medical College (1878), now Urmia University)).

Mashhad Faculty of Medicine is part of Mashhad University of Medical Sciences, which merged with the Faculty of Literature to form the University of Mashhad in 1954 when the new faculty opened with five different fields. With the expansion of higher education, the following faculties were subsequently established: Faculty of Theology, Faculty of Science, Faculty of Dentistry, Faculty of Pharmaceutical Sciences and Nutrition, Faculty of Education and Psychology, Faculty of Agriculture, Faculty of Engineering, the Institute of Optometry, the university's high school, and the Teaching Center. Mashhad University was renamed Ferdowsi University in 1974.

Before the 1979 Iranian revolution, the curriculum and research agenda at Ferdowsi were designed with the help of Georgetown University. However, this collaboration was halted after the revolution. The university also has one of the largest campuses in Iran.

After emerging regional health organizations in the universities of medical sciences in 1994, Mashhad University of Medical Sciences was separated from Ferdowsi University. Meanwhile, a number of new faculties and schools such as Faculty of Administration and Economics, Faculty of Veterinary Sciences, Shirvan Agricultural College, Faculty of Physical Education and Sports, Faculty of Mathematical Sciences, Neishaboor Faculty of the Arts, Institute of Plantation Science, The Seismology Research Center, the University's College, Faculty of Natural Resources and Environment, Faculty of Architecture and Urban Planning were established one after the another.

Academics

School of Letters and Humanities 
Founded in 1955, the School of Letters and Humanities, the nucleus and first school of the current FUM, offers graduate and postgraduate degrees in the fields of the Persian language and literature, English language and literature, Arabic language and literature, French language and literature, Russian language and literature, geography, Iranian history, social sciences, and linguistics. The Faculty has 83 academic members, 4500 undergraduate and 500 graduate students. The departments offer B.A., M.A., and PhD programs. Moreover, the Department of Persian Language and Literature is designated by the Iranian Ministry of Science, Research and Technology, as a Center of Excellence in Ferdowsi Studies.

School of Economics and Business Administration 
Founded in 1987, the Faculty of Economics and Business Administration currently has 53 faculty members and 2146 students. The programs offered at the Bachelor's, Master's and Ph.D. levels are Economic Science, Law, Accounting, Political Science, and Management.

The Research Center for the Economy of Eastern Iran and Neighboring Countries was established in 2006 for the purpose of conducting research into the economy of Iran and the neighboring countries. The Center has 11 economics specialists actively engaged in multifarious research projects.

Majors and programs offered in the Faculty of Economics:
 Economic Sciences – Business Economics
 Economic Sciences – Theoretical Economics
 Economic Sciences
 Economic Development and Planning
 Business Management
 Industrial Management
 Accounting
 Law
 Public Management
 Political Science

School of Theology 
Founded in 1958, the School of Theology has 48 faculty members and comprises five departments: Islamic History and Civilization, Islamic Philosophy, Islamic Jurisprudence, Koranic Studies, and Comparative Religion and Mysticism. The school offers programs at the Bachelors, Masters, and PhD levels.

School of Sciences 
Established in 1961, the School of Sciences has 97 faculty members, 1862 undergraduates, 325 Master's students, and 81 PhD students. The faculty comprises four departments: Biology, Chemistry, Geology, and Physics. Of these, the Department of Geology has been named as a Center of Excellence in Fossilology by the Iranian Ministry of Sciences, Research and Technology. The research centers at the School of Sciences include the Center for Research in Seismology, Center for Research in Rodentology, Center for Research in Nanotechnology, Center for Research in Biotechnology (Stem Cell & Molecular Research) and Center for Research in Environmental Chemistry to name but a few.

School of Mathematical Sciences 
Founded in 1996, the School of Mathematical Sciences has three departments: Applied Mathematics, Pure Mathematics and Statistics. The school has 45 academic members and approximately 1,300 students. Currently, there are 170 graduate enrollees. The School of Mathematical Sciences offers three programs specializing in Pure Mathematics, Applied Mathematics and Statistics at the Bachelor's, Master's and Ph.D. levels. Both the Departments of Mathematics and Statistics were named "Centers of Excellence" by the Ministry of Science, Research and Technology in 2000 and have retained the status since then.

School of Agriculture 
Established in 1973, the School of Agriculture has 101 faculty members and 1622 students. The college comprises the departments of Agricultural Economics, Agricultural Machinery, Agronomy, Animal Sciences, Food Science Industry, Gardening, Plant Pathology, Plant Breeding and Biotechnology, Soil Sciences, and Water Engineering. The College of Agriculture offers 10 programs: Agricultural Economics, Agricultural Machinery, Agronomy, Animal Sciences, Food Industry Science, Gardening, Plant Pathology, Plant Breeding and Biotechnology, Soil Sciences, and Water Engineering; these programs are offered at the Bachelor's, Master's, and Ph.D. levels. The Dept. of Agronomy is considered as a Center of Excellence in Special Crops.

School of Education and Psychology 
Established in 1973, the FUM School of Education and Psychology is home to 30 faculty members and about 1300 students. The school consists of 11 departments offering graduate and post-graduate programs in the fields of the educational management and planning, curriculum planning, education of disabled youth, pre-K education, the philosophy of education, clinical psychology, psychology of the disabled, general psychology, educational psychology, family counseling, and library and information sciences.

School of Veterinary Medicine 
Founded in 1991, the School of Veterinary Medicine has 37 faculty members and consists of the departments of Basic Sciences, Patho-biology, Clinical Sciences, and Agri-food Hygiene. There are 400 enrollees majoring in the B.Sc., Doctor of Veterinary Medicine (D.V.M.), Doctor of Veterinary Science (D.V.Sc.), and Ph.D. levels. The programs and degrees offered are Large Animal Internal Medicine (D.V.Sc.), Veterinary Parasitology (Ph.D.), Veterinary Biotechnology (Ph.D.), Veterinary Pathobiology (D.V.Sc.), Comparative Histology (Ph.D.), Doctorate in Veterinary Medicine (D.V.M.), and Veterinary Laboratory Sciences (B.Sc.). Academic members of the faculty are actively engaged in education and research in areas as diverse as clinical practice, domestic animal health and diseases, food safety, biology and public health. More importantly, the Research Center for Ruminant Abortion and Neonatal Mortality Studies is considered to be a Center of Excellence of the Faculty of Veterinary Medicine.

Faculty of Engineering 
On February 25, 1975, the Faculty of Engineering was established to serve as the leading engineering institution for the eastern part of Iran. In September 1975 (Mehr 1354), the Faculty of Engineering officially started its mission by admitting 30 students in the Electrical Engineering major and 30 students in Mechanical Engineering.

Courses are offered in B.Eng., M.Sc., Ph.D. in Electrical Engineering, Mechanical Engineering, Civil Engineering, Computer Engineering, Materials Engineering and B.Eng., M.Eng in Chemical Engineering, Industrial Engineering. The Electrical Engineering group of Ferdowsi University has many prominent research labs such as the integrated System Lab., corrosion and coating Lab. etc. According to Iranwatch (Tracking Iran's Unconventional Weapon Capabilities) in 2011, research on solid propellant combustion (for rocket motor chamber), air-to-air missile fuse electronics, robust controller design for a missile's yaw-channel, coastal missile defense systems as well as remotely piloted vehicle's guidance, navigation, and control computer system is being done in the university.

Faculty of Architecture, Urbanism and Islamic Art 
In July 2005, faculty of Architecture was founded in Ferdowsi university of Mashhad which consists of two distinct departments, Architecture Engineering and Urban planning. Each department offer Courses in B.Eng and M.Eng.

Research Institute of Biotechnology 
Institute of Biotechnology was established in 2006 for the promotion of biotechnological research of the university. The following groups are active:
 Cell and Molecular Biotechnology Research Group
 Veterinary Biotechnology Research Group
 Agriculture and Animal Biotechnology Research Group
 Cell Biology and Biotechnology of Embryo Research Group

Sun & Air Research Institute (SARI) 
SARI institute  was founded in October  2010 (Mehr 1389), for research in the field of Renewable energy. This institute has achieved many goals such as design and manufacturing of 100 kW Wind turbine. At the present time, this institute focuses on the development of  different types of wind turbine and assessment of Solar panels and solar machines as a future plan.

Admissions 
The admission rate range is 40–50%, making this Iranian higher education organization an averagely selective institution. However, considering the strong efforts to improve the higher institutions in religious cities after the Islamic Revolution (27% of the resources allocated to the university are reported to be funded through proprietary revenues other than the governmental budget), undergraduate admission to Ferdowsi is limited to the top 10–20% of students who pass the national entrance examination administered yearly by the Ministry of Culture and Higher Education and could not be admitted in University of Tehran, Sharif University of Technology, Amirkabir University of Technology, Iran University of Science and Technology and Shahid Beheshti University (mostly from the cities of Razavi Khorasan, and specially Mashhad). To attract top students, the Ferdowsi University of Mashhad has tried to use the scholarships so that after the increasing decline in admission rate in sciences (and especially physics), which was considered a serious threat to the university, additional scholarships are to be dedicated to all disciplines.

There are 12,645 undergraduate students, including 8,398 females (66.4%) and 4,247 males (33.6%) in the university.

Foreign students 
The Ferdowsi University of Mashhad is regarded as the first institution in attracting foreign students, mainly from Afghanistan, Lebanon, Syria, Yemen, Bahrain, Central Asian republics, after the efforts made during the presidency of Ahmadinejad who declared Mashhad as "Iran's spiritual capital". Currently, more than 1,300 foreign students  have enrolled in the Ferdowsi University of Mashhad, which form one twentieth of the university students. According to the head of the University, more than half of the  foreign students studying at the Ferdowsi University of Mashhad are from Afghanistan and have were admitted at the university by using scholarships (106 students), through participating in the National entrance examination (199 students) and as independent students (204 people).

According to a deputy president of Ferdowsi University of Mashhad, most of the foreign students studying in Iran are from Afghanistan, Syria, Iraq, Pakistan, and Turkey. According to Iran's Minister of Science, Research, and Technology (in a speech at a graduation ceremony of a number of foreign students of Ferdowsi University of Mashhad), many efforts were underway to attract as many as 25,000 by 2015 during the presidency of Ahmadinejad: "The improvement of the quality of universities has paved the way for the enrollment of foreign students. Fourteen thousand foreign students from 92 countries are currently studying at Iran's universities. And if we include the 12,000 foreign students studying at Al-Mustafa (International) University, a total of 26,000 foreign students are studying at higher education institutions in the country".

International interactions 
The university has been described with weak connection to other institutions. As the head of the University said, "less than 10% of our colleagues have international interactions in Ferdowsi University of Mashhad, showing a bad situation on the connection between our academics and the universities abroad so that in order to improve the cooperation with Russian universities, the Ferdowsi University of Mashhad pays the entire cost of any joint project that each of university professors have with a Russian university or a professor."

Publications 
FUM publishes 48 peer-reviewed scientific journals covering almost all fields of sciences and humanities. Some national notable journals are, Journal of Cell and Molecular Research (JCMR), Iranian Journal of Health and Physical Activity, Iranian Journal of Animal BioSystematics, Iranian Journal of Electrical Systems, Iranian Journal of Veterinary Science Technology, Iranian Journal of Numerical Analysis and Optimization, etc.

International rankings 

Times Higher Education World University Rankings :
2018: 801–1,000 2017: 801+

Academic Ranking of World Universities (Shanghai Ranking):2017: 701–800

U.S. News:
2018: 868
 Chemistry: 481
 Engineering ranking: 260
 Materials science: 384
2017: 820
 Agricultural sciences: 180
 Engineering ranking: 252
 Materials science: 368

CWTS Leiden Ranking:
2018: (P indicator): 478
2017: (P indicator): 509
2016: (P indicator): 537

SCImago Institutions Rankings:
2017:490
2016:572
2015:558

Famous events 
After the controversial appearance of President Mahmoud Ahmadinejad at Columbia University on 25 September 2007, Ferdowsi University of Mashhad invited President Bush to travel to Iran and speak on campus about a range of issues, including the Holocaust, terrorism, human rights and U.S. foreign policy. The invitation asked Bush to answer questions from students and professors "just the same way" that Ahmadinejad took questions "despite all the insults directed at him." The White House said that Bush would be willing to travel to Iran, but under different circumstances: "President Bush looks forward to traveling to a democratic Iran, an Iran where its leaders allow freedom of speech and assembly for all of its people and an Iran where the leaders mourn the victims of the Holocaust, not call for the destruction of Israel," National Security Council spokesman Gordon Johndroe said.

Some Iranian educational institutions such as Ferdowsi University of Mashhad have also been building their presence in Afghanistan. As Iranian officials announced in February 2009, the university opened a campus in Herat (named after a Persian poet who resided in Herat during the eleventh century)—the efforts that allow Iran to engage directly with Afghanistan's population and develop close ties with religious and ethnic minorities.

In 2011, Ferdowsi University's Department of Engineering in Mashhad said it would segregate students by gender in nearly 50 courses. One year before, a few general courses at Ferdowsi, such as general mathematics and physics, imposed separate classes for men and women. The disciplinary restrictions imposed on students, particularly female students, had been on the rise since June 2009, in many cases accompanied with insults and degradation of students.

Professor's Basij Organization (PBO) 
The emergence of Mahmud Ahmadinejad in the 2005 presidential election brought a new force to Iran's political power, namely, the Professor's Basij Organization (PBO). PBO offices were established at a few large universities, including Ferdowsi University of Mashhad. The military, Basij, and IRGC veterans teaching at these universities welcomed the establishment and inauguration of the Basij bureaus at universities, as most of them were already enrolled in such bureaus in other settings.
The number of the registered members of the Professor's Basij Organization in Razavi Khorasan is 2 thousand and 500, most of whom belong to the Ferdowsi University of Mashhad (it has 900 faculty members). According to the head of Razavi Khorasan's PBO, the number of Basiji professors is much greater than the number of the registered PBO members.
4,000 students of Mashhad's universities (mostly the Ferdowsi University of Mashhad) have registered in the Basij Organization.

Notable alumni

 Ali-Akbar Fayyaz, founder of the School of Letters and Humanities, Professor in the Department of Persian Language and Literature between 1950 and 1972, a renowned historian of early Islam and literary critic
 Ali Shariati, assistant professor in the Department of History at FUM between 1966 and 1971, who was compelled to resign from the university; globally renowned leftist-Islamic writer and lecturer, and the ideological father of the 1979 revolution
 Mohammad Mokhtari, graduate of the Department of Persian Language and Literature, a renowned poet, novelist, and literary critic, and a leading member of the Iranian P.E.N. in the 1980s and 1990s who was assassinated by elements from the Ministry of Intelligence of the Islamic Republic in 1999 as a victim of what was later labeled in Iranian political jargon "chain murders"
 Mohammad Reza Shafiei-Kadkani, graduate of the School of Letters and Humanities at FUM, professor of Persian Language and Literature at the University of Tehran, celebrated contemporary poet and literary critic
 Abdulaziz Sachedina, graduate of history from FUM, currently professor of religious studies at the University of Virginia
 Amir Khajepour, professor in mechanical engineering at the University of Waterloo, Ontario, Canada
 Dr. Seyed Ali Mirlohi Falavarjani, Retired Professor, Founder of Islamic Azad University of Falavarjan in 1984
 Seyyed Jalal al-Addin Ashtiani professor of philosophy
 Effat Shariati PhD (born 1952) is a former Member of the Parliament of Iran,
 Laleh Eftekhari is an Iranian conservative politician and former member of the Parliament of Iran representing Tehran, Rey, Shemiranat and Eslamshahr.
 Abdolreza Rahmani Fazli (عبدالرضا رحمانی فضلی in Persian; born 1959) is an Iranian conservative politician, government official and interior minister of Hassan Rouhani's government.
 Mahmoud Alavi (born 4 May 1954) is an Iranian cleric, politician and the minister of intelligence in Hassan Rouhani's government.
 Mohammad Abbasi, is a former conservative Member of the Parliament of Iran as well as minister of cooperatives and minister of youth affairs and sports of  President Mahmoud Ahmadinejad.

References

External links 

  
  
 Official English website of the Student Basij of the Ferdowsi University of Mashhad (affiliated with the Islamic Revolutionary Guard Corps)
 Official English website of the Professor's Basij Organization (PBO) of the Ferdowsi University of Mashhad (affiliated with the IRGC)
 Official English website of the Staff Basij of the Ferdowsi University of Mashhad (affiliated with the IRGC)

 
1949 establishments in Iran
Educational institutions established in 1949
Education in Razavi Khorasan Province
Buildings and structures in Razavi Khorasan Province